San Antonio de Esmoruco is a small town in Bolivia.

References

Populated places in Potosí Department